Terra is an unincorporated community in Tooele County, Utah, United States.

References

Unincorporated communities in Tooele County, Utah
Unincorporated communities in Utah